Shahrestanak  or Shahristanak may refer to:

Shahrestanak, Alborz
Shahrestanak, Mazandaran
Shahrestanak, Qazvin
Shahrestanak, Joghatai, Razavi Khorasan Province
Shahrestanak, Torbat-e Jam, Razavi Khorasan Province
Shahrestanak, South Khorasan
Shahrestanak, Tehran
Shahrestanak, Zanjan

See also
Shahrestan (disambiguation)